Cantonese merchants (Cantonese Jyutping: Jyut6 soeng1; Traditional Chinese: 粵商) refers to merchants of Cantonese origins, thought sometimes it is used to include Hakka and Teochew merchants who originated from the Southern Chinese province of Guongdung - where Cantonese people have been the dominant demographic. Historically, the Cantonese people have spent most of the second millennium AD being one of the main ports of successive Chinese dynasties, resulting in the formation of a distinct business culture which many cultural studies and business scholars have sought to examine.

Culture of the Cantonese merchants
Located in the southern fringe of China, far away from center of power, adjacent to Hong Kong and Macau, Cantonese merchants were the first to open up the market to Western European commerce and to accept economic and cultural exchange with Southeast Asia. As a result, a unique business culture emerged. According to scholars, the main characteristics of Cantonese merchants include:
Strong market sensitivity: Cantonese merchants are quick to discover new business opportunities. They are decisive and bold while others are hesitant. This is considered one of the reasons why Cantonese businessmen, among Han Chinese business people, are usually among the first to adopt advanced technology in doing their businesses.
Acceptance and inclusiveness: Cantonese merchants are open to a variety of capable people and new techniques. It has been pointed out that they are generally able to learn with open minds and are conducive to criticism and young talents. Scholars have also suggested that this is why many successful Cantonese merchants are of lower-class origins.
Pragmatism and robustness: Cantonese merchants do not make rash decisions. They do things step-by-step, believing that "only money actually in one's hand can be considered 'earned'". They avoid take risk unless they have thoroughly studied it. Their pragmatism prevents them from using garish means to do promotion. For instance, when Zhengzhou Asia tried to open department stores near Gwongzau, they attempted to use drum bands to welcome their customers every morning, but Cantonese businessmen did not see the meaning of it and none of them adopt the practice.
Belief in hard work: Most Cantonese business started from small business - such as hawkers - and tend to maintain a belief in hard work even when they have become big and successful. Among Cantonese merchants, it is quite common to see the boss running the stores personally while the staff rest, or the boss cleaning the stores by him/herself.

See also
Cantonese culture
Lingnan Confucianism

References